Tiruchendur railway station is a major railway station in the pilgrim centre Tiruchendur of the Thoothukudi district in the Indian state of Tamil Nadu. It connects the pilgrimage center of Tiruchendur to various destinations across the state.

History 
This line, which was proposed by the District Board of Tinnevelly in 1903. was surveyed by the South Indian railway administration during 1904. at the cost of the District Board. It will be 37.60 miles in length and is estimated to cost Rs. 20,52,000 on the metre gauge. Proposals for its financing are awaited from the District Board who have levied a special cess in order to form a railway construction fund for the district. 

The Tinnevelly–Tiruchendur Railway 38.18  miles railway on 24 February 1953 To buy from certain private railway company. The purchase price of the Tinnevelly–Tiruchendur Railway is Rs. 33.60 lakhs   The centenary celebrations of Tirunelveli – Tiruchendur train service were held in a few stations, including Tirunelveli Railway Junction, on Thursday as these two towns were connected by train on this day 100 years ago. After Tirunelveli got the rail connectivity, then ‘Jilla Board Member’ Arumuganeri ‘Mela Veedu’ S.P. Ponnaiah Nadar started taking efforts to connect Tiruchendur with Tirunelveli by train. Following the efforts spearheaded by him, the Colonial government passed the resolution on October 1, 1900 favouring the establishment of rail connectivity between Tirunelveli and Tiruchendur. Subsequently, the ‘Jilla Board Meeting’ held on March 23, 1903 gave its approval for laying the rail track between the two towns and the first train service was flagged off on February 23, 1923, thanks to the 10-year-long sustained efforts of Ponnaiah Nadar during the British Regime. To commemorate the priceless contribution of the late Ponnaiah Nadar, the Arumuganeri Railway Development Committee members paid floral tribute to his portrait on Thursday as part of the celebration and distributed sweets to the public.

Administration 
It belongs to the Madurai railway division.

Services 

The Chendur Express is originating here for Chennai.

 Palakkad Junction–Tiruchendur Passenger (via Palani) (unreserved)
 Tirunelveli–Tiruchendur Passenger (unreserved)
 Tuticorin–Tiruchendur Passenger (unreserved)

References

External links 
India Rail Info

Madurai railway division
Railway stations in Thoothukudi district
Railway terminus in India